João Lucas Reis da Silva (born 26 March 2000) is a Brazilian tennis player.

Reis da Silva has a career high ATP singles ranking of 301 achieved on 6 March 2023. He also has a career high doubles ranking of 345 achieved on 21 November 2022.

Reis da Silva has won 1 ATP Challenger doubles title at the 2023 Challenger de Santiago with Pedro Boscardin Dias.

References

External links
 
 

2000 births
Living people
Brazilian male tennis players
Sportspeople from Recife